Edward Caruana Dingli may refer to:

 Edward Caruana Dingli (artist) (1876–1950), Maltese artist
 Edward Caruana Dingli (swimmer) (born 1992), Maltese swimmer